Quirine Lemoine (born 25 December 1991) is a retired Dutch tennis player. She won 19 singles titles and 27 doubles titles on the ITF Women's Circuit. On 3 July 2017, she reached her best singles ranking of world No. 137. On 14 August 2017, she peaked at No. 116 in the WTA doubles rankings.

Lemoine made her WTA Tour debut at the 2015 Brasil Tennis Cup, defeating Gaia Sanesi in the singles qualifying. She also made her WTA Tour main-draw debut in doubles there, partnering Susanne Celik. She won her first WTA title at the 2017 Swedish Open held in Båstad, partnering Arantxa Rus. In the on-court television interview after the win, she said that the success was even more special because the two had been friends since they were ten years old.

In July 2022, Lemoine announced her retirement with the $60k Amstelveen Open tournament playing in her home country.

Grand Slam singles performance timeline

Singles

WTA career finals

Doubles: 1 (title)

ITF Circuit finals

Singles: 25 (19 titles, 6 runner–ups)

Doubles: 38 (27 titles, 11 runner–ups)

Notes

References

External links

 
 
 
 
 

1991 births
Living people
Dutch female tennis players
People from Woerden
21st-century Dutch women
Sportspeople from Utrecht (province)